Ratnowice  is a village in the administrative district of Gmina Otmuchów, within Nysa County, Opole Voivodeship, in south-western Poland, close to the Czech border.

The village has an approximate population of 230.

References

External links
 
 Ratnowice as an example of three-field crop rotation settlement

Ratnowice